Ellen Vilbaste (4 March 1893, Tartu – 14 February 1974, Kolga-Jaani) was an Estonian gardener and Estonia's first trained ethnobotanist.  Eight hundred of her gathered specimens are held at the Estonian Plant Herbarium.

References 

1893 births
1974 deaths
20th-century Estonian women scientists
20th-century Estonian botanists
Ethnobotanists
University of Tartu alumni
Scientists from Tartu